The Southern League All-Star Game was an annual baseball game sanctioned by Minor League Baseball between professional players from the teams of the Double-A Southern League. Each division, North and South, fielded a team composed of players in their respective divisions as voted on by the managers, general managers, and broadcasters from each of the league's eight clubs.

From the first All-Star Game in 1964 through 1998, the event predominantly consisted of a single team of the league's All-Stars versus a Major League Baseball team. The division versus division format was used from 1999 to 2019. No game was held from 1991 to 1995 as the Southern League and the other two Double-A leagues, the Eastern League and Texas League, participated in the Double-A All-Star Game instead.

Traditionally, the game took place during the three-day All-Star break between the first and second halves of the season. The game was meant to mark the halfway-point in the season with the first 70 games being played before and the remaining 70 after. Some additional events, such as the Home Run Derby and All-Star Fan Fest occurred each year during this break in the regular season.

History 
The first Southern League All-Star Game was played in 1964 at Rickwood Field in Birmingham, Alabama. In the inaugural game, held in the league's first season of operation, the hosting Birmingham Barons served as the competition for a team of Southern League All-Stars as they held first place at a predetermined point in the season. Through 1998, the game usually pitted an All-Star team versus a Major League Baseball (MLB) team, sometimes the host's major league affiliate. The Atlanta Braves participated in 12 All-Star Games, the most among MLB teams. The Minnesota Twins, Houston Astros, Toronto Blue Jays, Chicago Cubs, and Seattle Mariners also competed in one game each.

Other arrangements were also utilized. On seven occasions, a Southern League team, usually the league's leader at a given point before the game, was selected to compete against the All-Stars. These were the Birmingham Barons, Columbus Confederate Yankees, Mobile A's, Montgomery Rebels, Memphis Chicks, Nashville Sounds, and Mobile BayBears. In such instances, players from the rival team who were voted onto All-Star teams played for their own clubs, or the league prohibited voting for players on the host team and chose to recognize all players on those teams as All-Stars. Triple-A teams twice served as the All-Stars' opponents: in 1986 against Nashville, which had moved to the American Association, and in 1987 versus the International League's Richmond Braves. In 1990, one team was made up of All-Stars from American League affiliates and the other of National League affiliates.

A division versus division format, where each division fields a team composed of players in their respective divisions, was used intermittently—first in 1975 and again in 1984 and 1988. This format was readopted in 1999 and has been utilized each year since. From 1999 to 2004, it was East against West. Since realignment in 2005, it has been North versus South.

No game was held from 1991 to 1995 as the Southern League and the other two Double-A leagues, the Eastern League and Texas League, participated in the Double-A All-Star Game instead. The Southern League continued to participate in the Double-A All-Star Game through its final contention in 2002 but resumed holding its own All-Star Game in 1996.

The 2019 All-Star Game in Biloxi, Mississippi, became the final one to be held. The 2020 event planned to occur in Jackson, Tennessee, was cancelled along with the entire season due to the COVID-19 pandemic. Prior to the 2021 season, Major League Baseball assumed control of Minor League Baseball and the Southern League ceased operations.

Structure 
In the final 2019 All-Star Game, each division's roster consisted of 25 players, as voted on by the managers, general managers, and broadcasters from each of the league's eight clubs. The actual number of players on gameday may have been less due to call-ups, injuries, or players choosing not to participate. Nonparticipants retained their All-Star status. The game itself consisted of a single nine-inning game to determine a champion. The division in which the host city competes was considered the home team for the game and the other team was designated the visiting team. Designated hitters batted in place of the pitchers.

Historically, players wore their respective team's uniforms. Typically, players on the home team wore their club's white home uniforms, while players on the away team wore their club's gray road uniforms. This changed in 2019 when players wore division-specific jerseys paired with the appropriate home/road pants and their respective team's cap.

Results

Most Valuable Player Award 

The Most Valuable Player (MVP) Award was bestowed on the player with the best performance at each All-Star Game. No award was given in the first eight games (1964–1971) or in 1973's rain-shortened game, but it was awarded continuously 1974 to 2019. Eight players from the Birmingham Barons were selected for the MVP Award, more than any other team in the league. The Jacksonville Expos/Suns had the second-most with five MVPs. Seven players from the Chicago White Sox organization won the MVP Award, the most of any Major League Baseball organization. They are followed by the Detroit Tigers with five MVPs and the Atlanta Braves and Florida Marlins with four winners each. The only player to win the MVP Award more than once is Birmingham's Jeff Inglin, who won back-to-back in 1999 and 2000.

Notes

References 
Specific

General

Southern League
All-star games
Baseball competitions in the United States
Recurring sporting events established in 1964
Recurring sporting events disestablished in 2021